The Windrose 24 is an American trailerable sailboat that was designed by W. Shad Turner as a cruiser and first built in 1974.

Production
The design was built by Laguna Yachts in the United States, between 1974 and 1983, but it is now out of production.

Design
The Windrose 24 is a recreational keelboat, built predominantly of fiberglass, with wood trim and a cabin "pop-top" for increased headroom. It has a fractional sloop rig, a spooned raked stem, a plumb transom, a transom-hung rudder controlled by a tiller and a retractable swing keel. It displaces  and carries  of ballast.

The boat is normally fitted with a small  outboard motor for docking and maneuvering.

The design has sleeping accommodation for four people, with a double "V"-berth in the bow cabin and a drop-down dinette table on the port side that forms a double berth. The optional sliding galley is located on the starboard side and is equipped with a two-burner stove, ice box and a sink. The head is located just aft of the bow cabin on the port side.

Operational history
In a 2010 review Steve Henkel wrote, "Shad Turner, who in the 1970s and 1980s also designed sailboats for W. D. Schock and Lancer, drew a whole series of boats for Laguna Yachts, including various Windroses, Lagunas, and Balboas. The result was usually, as in this case, a lightweight cruiser, not especially fast or stable, but designed for trailering and easy beaching for a picnic. Best features: Like her comp[etitor]s, the Windrose 24 has a modestly sized sailplan, in keeping with her low (25%) ballast-to-displacement ratio and swing keel of only 600 pounds. She has a poptop, which the builder claimed in brochures gives 6' 2" headroom, but at least one owner measured and got 5' 10". Ah well, either is better than the 4' 4" stooping headroom without the poptop. Worst features: The rudder, which is not retractable when traversing rocky shoals with the board up, is therefore vulnerable to damage. The winch used to raise and lower the 600-pound keel needs frequent maintenance to prevent binding and seizing. Forward V-berth is only big enough for kids."

See also
List of sailing boat types

References

External links
Photo of a Windrose 24

Keelboats
1970s sailboat type designs
Sailing yachts
Trailer sailers
Sailboat type designs by W. Shad Turner
Sailboat types built by Laguna Yachts